Rambi Ara is a river and tributary to the River Jhelum located in Shopian District in the union territory of Jammu and Kashmir. It joins the Veshaw River near Sangam in Anantnag District before the confluence finally meets the Jhelum. The Rambi Ara originates in the Pir Panjal Range and has two major tributaries. The Rambi Ara is known for fluctuating water levels and is often affected by flash floods.

References

Indus basin
Rivers of Jammu and Kashmir
Rivers of India